The Ponton train derailment, near Ponton, Manitoba on September 15, 2018, fatally injured train conductor Kevin Anderson, injured the train's engineer, and triggered a spill of diesel fuel.

Background 
The train was pulled by 3 locomotives, and contained "several dozen" tanker cars, loaded with "liquid petroleum".  Initially Arctic Gateway Group reported that no oil had been spilled.  On September 19 Global News described the train's cargo in greater detail, stating it included gasoline, liquid propane gas and butane.  Global reported that while none of the cargo had been spilled rail workers were trying to contain diesel fuel that was leaking from the locomotives.

The train was crossing the Metishto River, when it derailed.  Accounts differ as to when the train derailed.  Global reports the train derailed at 6:45 pm.  CBC reports the train derailed around 3:45 am.  First responders arrived around 5:45.  Anderson's autopsy stated Anderson died from blood loss, and his wounds were survivable.  However he continued to bleed for hours, after first responders arrived.

By September 20 several news sources reported an investigator from the Transportation Safety Board attributed the derailment to the work of beavers.

See also

 List of rail accidents in Canada

References 

Rail transport in Manitoba
Derailments in Canada